Felony disenfranchisement in the United States is the suspension or withdrawal of voting rights due to the conviction of a criminal offense. The actual class of crimes that results in disenfranchisement vary between jurisdictions, but most commonly classed as felonies, or may be based on a certain period of incarceration or other penalty. In some jurisdictions disfranchisement is permanent, while in others suffrage is restored after a person has served a sentence, or completed parole or probation. Felony disenfranchisement is one among the collateral consequences of criminal conviction and the loss of rights due to conviction for criminal offense. In 2016, 6.1 million individuals were disenfranchised on account of a conviction, 2.47% of voting-age citizens. As of October 2020, it was estimated that 5.1 million voting-age US citizens were disenfranchised for the 2020 presidential election on account of a felony conviction, 1 in 44 citizens. As suffrage rights are generally bestowed by state law, state felony disenfranchisement laws also apply to elections to federal offices.

Proponents have argued that persons who commit felonies have broken the social contract, and have thereby given up their right to participate in a civil society. Some argue that felons have shown poor judgment, and that they should therefore not have a voice in the political decision-making process. Opponents have argued that such disfranchisement restricts and conflicts with principles of universal suffrage. It can affect civic and communal participation in general. Opponents argue that felony disenfranchisement can create political incentives to skew criminal law in favor of disproportionately targeting groups who are political opponents of those who hold power.

Many states adopted felon voting bans in the 1860s and 1870s, at the same time that voting rights for black citizens were being considered and contested. Scholars have linked the origins and intents of many state felon voting bans to racial discrimination. In some states, legislators have been accused of specifically tailoring felon voting bans to purposely and disproportionately target African Americans, for example, by targeting minor crimes more common among these citizens while allowing felons who committed more serious crimes (such as murder) to vote.

History

The first US felony provisions were introduced in 1792 in Kentucky, although the first actual law disenfranchising felons was introduced by Connecticut in 1818. By 1840 four states had felony disenfranchisement policies. By the American Civil War, about 24 states had some form of felony disenfranchisement policy or similar provision in the state constitution, although only eighteen actually disenfranchised felons The Fourteenth Amendment was adopted in 1868, and by 1870 the number had increased to 28 (out of 38 states).

The surge of felony disenfranchisement laws after the Civil War led many to conclude that the laws were implemented as part of a strategy to disenfranchise blacks,   especially as the policy was expanded in conjunction with the Black Codes, which established severe penalties for petty crimes and especially targeted black Americans.

As of 2018, most U.S. states had policies to restore voting rights upon completion of a sentence.  Only a couple states — Iowa, and Virginia specifically — permanently disenfranchised a felony convict and 6 other states limited restoration based on crimes of "moral turpitude". Kentucky being a constitutional state now allows felons to vote

The US Supreme Court in Richardson v. Ramirez (1974), interpreted section 2  of the Fourteenth Amendment as permitting states to disenfranchise convicted criminals, leaving them to decide which crimes would be grounds for disenfranchisement, which are not restricted to felonies, though in most cases they do. Felons who have completed their sentences are allowed to vote in most states. Between 1996 and 2008, 28 states changed their laws on felon voting rights, mostly to restore rights or to simplify the process of restoration. Since 2008, state laws have continued to shift, both curtailing and restoring voter rights, sometimes over short periods of time within the same state.

Recent statistics
As of 2008, over 5.3 million people in the United States were denied the right to vote due to felony disenfranchisement. In the national elections in 2012, the various state felony disenfranchisement laws together blocked an estimated 5.85 million felons from voting, up from 1.2 million in 1976. This comprised 2.5% of the potential voters in general. The state with the highest number of disenfranchised voters was Florida, with 1.5 million disenfranchised because of a current or previous felony conviction, over 10% of the voting age citizens, including the 774,000 disenfranchised only because of outstanding financial obligations. In October 2020, it was estimated that 5.1 million citizens were disenfranchised for the 2020 presidential election on account of a felony conviction, 1 in 44 citizens.

Reform efforts
Challenges to felony disenfranchisement laws began in the 1950s as part of the effort of advocating for a shift from retribution to rehabilitation in the American penal system. After the latter part of the 1950s, the ratio of states disenfranchising those convicted of crimes decreased; in the twentieth century, some categories of felons were disenfranchised while others were not and several state laws were revised to provide a broader criminal coverage. Disenfranchisement laws have been amended, since 1997, by 23 states. These reforms take three forms: repeal of lifetime disenfranchisement laws; expansion of voting rights; and simplification of the process of restoring voting rights post-incarceration.

In 2002, Representative Maxine Waters (D, CA) introduced H.R.2830, the Voting Restoration Act, to congress.

From 1997 to 2008, there was a trend to lift the disenfranchisement restrictions, or simplify the procedures for applying for the restoration of civil rights for persons who had fulfilled their punishments for felonies. As a result, in 2008, more than a half-million people had the right to vote who would have been disenfranchised under prior restrictions.

Felony disenfranchisement was a topic of debate during the 2012 Republican presidential primary. Primary candidate Rick Santorum from Pennsylvania argued for the restoration of voting rights for convicted felons who had completed sentences and parole/probation. Santorum's position was attacked and distorted by Mitt Romney, who alleged that Santorum supported voting rights for felons while incarcerated. Former President Barack Obama supports voting rights for ex-offenders.

In a report submitted to the United Nations Human Rights Committee in 2013, a coalition of non-profit civil rights and criminal justice organizations argued that US felony disenfranchisement laws are in violation of Articles 25 and 26 of the International Covenant on Civil and Political Rights (ICCPR), ratified by United States in 1992.

In 2017, Senator Benjamin L. Cardin (D, MD) introduced S. 1588, the Democracy Restoration Act of 2017 to Congress.

Felony disenfranchisement reforms between 1997 and 2018 have resulted in 1.4 million Americans regaining voting rights.

During the 2020 Democratic presidential primary, candidate Bernie Sanders argued that all felons should be allowed to vote from prison. His home state of Vermont is one of only two states (with Maine) that do not disenfranchise felons while in prison.

Florida

On November 6, 2018, Florida voters approved Amendment 4, an amendment to the state constitution to automatically restore voting rights to convicted felons who have served their sentences. Lifetime bans still apply for those convicted of either murder or sexual offenses. In July 2019, Republicans in Florida's state legislature enacted Senate bill 7066, which stipulates that felons must pay all outstanding fines, fees, and restitutions before they are deemed to have “served their sentence” and thus regain their right to vote. On February 19, 2020, a three-judge panel of the 11th circuit federal appeals court ruled that it was unconstitutional to force Florida felons to first pay off their financial obligations before registering to vote. However, on September 11, 2020 the United States Court of Appeals for the Eleventh Circuit overturned the lower court ruling that all fines do not have to be paid off before felons can be re-enfranchised. The appeals court ruling had the effect of again disenfranchising around 774,000 people, about a month before the 2020 U.S. presidential elections. In late September 2020, former New York City mayor Michael Bloomberg put together a fund of over $16 million to be used towards helping convicted felons vote in Florida by paying their outstanding fines and fees. Bloomberg's fund as well as the $5 million raised by the Florida Rights Restoration Coalition paid off the outstanding fines of around 32,000 felons.

Iowa
Iowa’s constitution provides for permanent felony disenfranchisement. However, in July 2005, Iowa’s Democratic Governor Tom Vilsack issued an executive order restoring voting rights of all persons who had completed supervision, which was upheld by Iowa's Supreme Court on October 31, 2005. However, on his inauguration day, January 14, 2011, Republican Governor Terry Branstad reversed Vilsack's executive order, again disenfranchising thousands of people. As of January 2020, Iowa was the only state to impose a lifetime felony voting ban, regardless of the crime committed. On August 5, 2020, Iowa Republican Governor Kim Reynolds signed an executive order restoring voting rights to about 24,000 people who had completed their sentences, except those convicted of murder. Reynolds also urged Iowa lawmakers to amend Iowa’s constitution to end permanent felony disenfranchisement.

Kentucky
In December 2019, Kentucky's newly elected Democratic governor, Andy Beshear, signed an executive order to restore voting rights and the right to hold public office to more than 140,000 residents who have completed sentences for nonviolent felonies.

Nevada
In Nevada in 2019, the legislature introduced AB 431 which was passed and signed into law, taking effect on July 1, 2019 which restored the right to vote for felons who were no longer serving a prison sentence in the state of Nevada.

Tennessee 
The Campaign Legal Center (CLC), as part of its national "Restore Your Vote Campaign," is actively engaged in restoring voting rights to disenfranchised felons in the state of Tennessee, and filed a lawsuit (Falls v. Goins) on behalf of two citizens of Tennessee against the state.

As part of discussions in the Tennessee General Assembly in 2019-2020 about a bill aimed at reforming Tennessee's restoration process, a joint policy brief compiled by libertarian political advocacy group Americans for Prosperity, the Tennessee public policy think tank Think Tennessee, and Nashville-based reintegration organization Project Return, was submitted to the Constitutional Protections & Sentencing Subcommittee, but failed to pass. The brief discusses numerous benefits of voting rights restoration for felons, including saving tax money and reducing recidivism, as well as potential enfranchisement strategies.

Most recently, on August 20, 2020, Tennessee Governor Bill Lee signed H.B. 8005 and S.B. 8005, increasing the penalty for camping on unapproved state property from a misdemeanor to a Class E felony, punishable by up to six years in prison and automatic loss of voting rights, as per Tennessee law. This move was a result of a two-month-long protest against institutional racism and police brutality that involved a round-the-clock encampment on capitol grounds.

Virginia

The Virginia legislature in 2017 debated relaxation of the state's policy that restoration of voting rights requires an individual act by the governor.

Other states
Nine other states disenfranchise felons for various lengths of time following their conviction. Except for Maine and Vermont, every state prohibits felons from voting while in prison.

Constitutionality
Unlike most laws that burden the right of citizens to vote based on some form of social status, felony disenfranchisement laws have been held to be constitutional. In Richardson v. Ramirez (1974), the United States Supreme Court upheld the constitutionality of felon disenfranchisement statutes, finding that the practice did not deny equal protection to disenfranchised voters. The Court looked to Section 2 of the Fourteenth Amendment to the United States Constitution, which proclaims that States in which adult male citizens are denied the right to vote for any reason other than "participation in rebellion, or other crime" will suffer a reduction in the basis of their representation in Congress. Based on this language, the Court found that this amounted to an "affirmative sanction" of the practice of felon disenfranchisement, and the 14th Amendment could not prohibit in one section that which is expressly authorized in another. 

But critics of the practice, such as The United States Commission on Civil Rights, The Lawyers‘ Committee for Civil Rights Under Law and The Sentencing Project, among others, argue that Section 2 of the 14th Amendment allows, but does not represent an endorsement of, felony disenfranchisement statutes as constitutional in light of the equal protection clause and is limited only to the issue of reduced representation. The Court ruled in Hunter v. Underwood 471 U.S. 222, 232 (1985) that a state's crime disenfranchisement provision will violate Equal Protection if it can be demonstrated that the provision, as enacted, had "both [an] impermissible racial motivation and racially discriminatory impact." (The law in question also disenfranchised people convicted of vagrancy, adultery, and any misdemeanor "involving moral turpitude"; the test case involved two individuals who faced disenfranchisement for presenting invalid checks, which the state authorities had found to be morally turpid behavior.) A felony disenfranchisement law, which on its face is indiscriminate in nature, cannot be invalidated by the Supreme Court unless its enforcement is proven to racially discriminate and to have been enacted with racially discriminatory animus.

Classifications
Restoration of voting rights for people who are ex-offenders varies across the United States. Primary classification of voting rights include:

No disenfranchisement
Two states, Maine and Vermont, as well as the District of Columbia, have unrestricted voting rights for people who are felons. They allow the person to vote during incarceration, via absentee ballot, and have no specific restrictions upon completion of their sentence.

Ends after release 
In 21 states, disenfranchisement ends after incarceration is complete: California, Colorado, Connecticut, Hawaii, Illinois, Indiana, Maryland, Massachusetts, Michigan, Montana, Nevada, New Hampshire, New Jersey, New York, North Dakota, Ohio, Oregon, Pennsylvania, Rhode Island, Utah, and Washington.

Ends after probation 
Sixteen states require not only that incarceration/parole if any be complete but also that any probation sentence (which is often an alternative to incarceration) be complete: Alaska, Arkansas, Georgia, 
Idaho, Kansas, Louisiana, Minnesota,
Missouri, New Mexico, North Carolina, Oklahoma, South Carolina, South Dakota, Texas, West Virginia (the prosecutor can request the court to revoke voting rights if financial obligations are unmet), and Wisconsin.

Circumstantial 
Nine states have laws that relate disenfranchisement to the detail of the crime. These laws restore voting rights to some offenders on the completion of incarceration, parole, and probation. Other offenders must make an individual petition that could be denied.

Individual petitions required 
Two states require felons to petition to the court for restoration of voting after all offenses.

Racial disparities 
Felony disenfranchisement policies in the United States impact people of color disproportionally. Compared to the rest of the voting age population, African Americans are four times more likely to lose their voting rights. More than 7.4 percent of African American adults are banned from voting due to felony convictions. Meanwhile, 1.8 percent of those who are not African American are banned from voting.

Economic factors 

While some states automatically restore voting rights after incarceration, about thirty states condition the restoration of voting rights to the individual's ability to pay legal debts. Those who are unable to pay these debts are automatically disenfranchised.

Impact

Political 
According to a 2002 study in the American Sociological Review, multiple Senate races and even presidential elections would likely have had different outcomes if felons had not been disenfranchised. A 2021 study in the Journal of Politics found that fewer than one in ten incarcerated eligible voters in Maine and Vermont voted in the 2018 elections, leading the authors to suggest that extending voting rights for those currently imprisoned in other states would likely not have a meaningful impact on those states' elections.

Health 
A 2013 study found that felony disenfranchisement contributes to adverse health outcomes: lack of ability to influence health policy through the electoral process reduces distribution of resources to that group, and contributes to allostatic load, by way of complicating the reintegration process.

Recidivism 
A 2012 study argues that felony disenfranchisement "further isolates and segregates ex-felons re-entering into society by denying them the ability to participate in the political process."

See also
 Transgender disenfranchisement in the United States

Notes

References

Further reading
 Bowers M, Preuhs R. Collateral Consequences of a Collateral Penalty: The Negative Effect of Felon Disenfranchisement Laws on the Political Participation of Nonfelons. Social Science Quarterly (Blackwell Publishing Limited) [serial online]. September 2009;90(3):722–743.
 Goldman, D. S. (2004). The Modern-Day Literacy Test?: Felon Disenfranchisement and Race Discrimination. Stanford Law Review, (2), 611.
 Hinchcliff, A. M. (2011). The "Other" Side of Richardson v. Ramirez: A Textual Challenge to Felon Disenfranchisement. Yale Law Journal, 121(1), 194–236.
 Manza, J., Brooks, C., & Uggen, C. (2004). Public Attitudes toward Felon Disenfranchisement in the United States. The Public Opinion Quarterly, (2), 275.
 Miles, T. J. (2004). Felon Disenfranchisement and Voter Turnout. The Journal of Legal Studies, (1), 85.
 Miller, B., & Spillane, J. (n.d). Civil death: An examination of ex-felon disenfranchisement and reintegration. Punishment & Society-International Journal of Penology, 14(4), 402–428.
 Siegel, J. A. (2011). Felon Disenfranchisement and the Fight for Universal Suffrage. Social Work, 56(1), 89–91.

External links
 State-by-state overview for the United States by the National Association of Criminal Defense Lawyers
 Felony Disenfranchisement  page from The Sentencing Project
 Gabriel J. Chin, Reconstruction, Felon Disenfranchisement and the Right to Vote: Did the Fifteenth Amendment Repeal Section 2 of the Fourteenth?, 92 Georgetown Law Journal 259 (2004)

Historical Timeline US History of Felon Voting/Disenfranchisement at ProCon.org

History of voting rights in the United States
Right of felons to vote
Criminal justice reform in the United States